The following highways are numbered 696:

United States